Prasophyllum frenchii, commonly known as the maroon leek orchid or swamp leek orchid, is a species of orchid endemic to south-eastern continental Australia. It has a single tubular green leaf and up to sixty five green, reddish-brown or red flowers. Formerly more widespread, it is now confined to seven populations containing a total of fewer than 1,000 plants.

Description
Between twenty and sixty five scented flowers are arranged along a flowering stem  or more high. The flowers are scented, green, reddish-brown or red and as with others in the genus, are inverted so that the labellum is above the column rather than below it. The upturned part is triangular and the edges of the labellum are slightly crinkled. There is a raised, horseshoe-shaped callus in the centre of the labellum. Flowering occurs from October to November.

Taxonomy and naming
Prasophyllum frenchii was first formally described in 1889 by Ferdinand von Mueller and the description was published in The Victorian Naturalist from a specimen collected by "G. French". The specific epithet (frenchii) "is named after the youthful collector, who has filially inherited from one of the principal founders of the Field-Naturalists' Club his ardour for forming, by searches of his own, zoologic and phytologic collections, and instituting observations thereon".

Distribution and habitat
The maroon leek orchid is widespread but rare, occurring from south-eastern Victoria to the south-east of South Australia. It grows in grassland, heath and open forest.

Conservation
Records indicate that P. frenchii was once likely to have numbered in many thousands and occurred as far east as Mallacoota in far East Gippsland. It is preserved in Wilsons Promontory National Park but is probably now extinct east of there. Only about 250 to 750 plants survive in seven populations and the species is listed as "Endangered" under the Commonwealth Government Environment Protection and Biodiversity Conservation Act 1999 (EPBC) Act, as "Threatened" under the Victorian Flora and Fauna Guarantee Act 1988 and as "Endangered" under the South Australian National Parks and Wildlife Act 1972. The main threats to the population are grazing, weed invasion and inappropriate fire regimes.

References

External links 
 
 

frenchii
Flora of South Australia
Flora of Victoria (Australia)
Endemic orchids of Australia
Plants described in 1889
Taxa named by Ferdinand von Mueller